Fairmount Park may refer to:

Fairmount Park, a municipal park in Philadelphia, Pennsylvania
Fairmount Park (Riverside, California), a municipal park 
Fairmount Park, San Diego, California, a neighborhood
Fairmount Park, Seattle, Washington, a western neighborhood
Fairmount Park Racetrack, a horse racing track in Collinsville, Illinois

See also
Fairmount (disambiguation)
Fairmont (disambiguation)